Norway participated in the Eurovision Song Contest 2014 in Copenhagen, Denmark. The Norwegian entry was selected through the national competition Melodi Grand Prix 2014, organised by the Norwegian broadcaster Norsk rikskringkasting (NRK). Norway was represented by the song "Silent Storm" performed by Carl Espen and written by Josefin Winther. The entry qualified from the second semi-final and placed 8th in the final, scoring 88 points.

Before Eurovision

Melodi Grand Prix 2014 
Melodi Grand Prix 2014 was the 52nd edition of the Norwegian national final Melodi Grand Prix and selected Norway's entry for the Eurovision Song Contest 2014. The competition consisted of three semi-finals and a final, all taking place at the Folketeatret in Oslo, hosted by Jenny Skavlan and Erik Solbakken. The shows were televised on NRK1 as well as streamed online at NRK's official website nrk.no. The final was also broadcast online at the official Eurovision Song Contest website eurovision.tv.

Format
The competition consisted of four shows: three semi-finals on 7, 8 and 9 March 2014 and a final on 15 March 2014. Five songs competed in each semi-final and the top three entries proceeded to the final. The results in the semi-finals and final were determined exclusively by public televoting. A four-member jury panel also provided commentary regarding the competing entries during each of the four shows. The jury panel consisted of:
Marie Komissar – NRK P3 radio host and music producer
Kathrine Synnes Finnskog – Manager and director of Music Norway
Gisle Stokland – Manager, owner and editor of the website 730.no
Tarjei Strøm – Musician and radio host

Competing entries
A submission period was opened by NRK between 4 July 2013 and 15 September 2013. Songwriters of any nationality were allowed to submit entries. In addition to the public call for submissions, NRK reserved the right to directly invite certain artists and composers to compete. At the close of the deadline, 600 submissions were received. Fifteen songs were selected for the competition by a jury panel consisting of Vivi Stenberg (Melodi Grand Prix music producer), Marie Komissar (NRK P3 radio host and music producer), Kathrine Synnes Finnskog (manager and director of Music Norway), Gisle Stokland (manager, owner and editor of the website 730.no) and Tarjei Strøm (musician and radio host). The competing acts and songs were revealed on 27 January 2014 during a press conference. Short previews of the competing entries were released during the press conference, while the songs in their entirety were premiered on 19 February.

Semi-finals
Three semi-finals were held on 7, 8 and 9 March 2014. In each semi-final five songs competed and the top three entries were selected to proceed to the final.

Final
Nine songs consisting of the nine semi-final qualifiers competed during the final on 15 March 2014. The winner was selected over two rounds of public televoting. In the first round, the top four entries were selected to proceed to the second round, the Gold Final: "Taste of You" performed by Knut Kippersund Nesdal, "Heal" performed by Mo, "High Hopes" performed by Linnea Dale and "Silent Storm" performed by Carl Espen. In the Gold Final, the results of the public televote were revealed by Norway's five regions and led to the victory of "Silent Storm" performed by Carl Espen with 53,712 votes.

At Eurovision

To ensure fair ticket distribution in the Nordic region for the semi-finals, the Eurovision Reference Group, at the request by the host broadcaster for the 2014 contest DR, held a draw at the European Broadcasting Union headquarters in Geneva in November 2013 where Norway was drawn to compete in the second semi-final on 8 May 2014. During the semi-final allocation draw on 20 January 2014 at the Copenhagen City Hall, Norway was drawn to compete in the first half of the second semi-final. In the second semi-final, the producers of the show decided that Norway would perform 3rd, following Israel and preceding Georgia. Norway qualified from the second semi-final and competed in the final on 10 May 2014. During the winner's press conference for the second semi-final qualifiers, Norway was allocated to compete in the first half of the final. In the final, the producers of the show decided that Norway would perform 5th, following Iceland and preceding Romania. Norway placed 8th in the final, scoring 88 points.

On stage, Carl Espen was joined by four violinists and a pianist. The violinists performed on a sloped platform. The stage atmosphere transitioned from a dark setting at the beginning which became brighter as the song progressed.

In Norway, both the semi-final and final were broadcast on NRK1 with commentary by Olav Viksmo-Slettan. An alternative broadcast of the final aired on NRK3 with commentary by the hosts of the NRK P3 program P3morgen, Ronny Brede Aase, Silje Reiten Nordnes and Line Elvsåshagen. The Norwegian spokesperson revealing the result of the Norwegian vote in the final was Margrethe Røed.

Voting

Points awarded to Norway

Points awarded by Norway

Detailed voting results
The following members comprised the Norwegian jury:
 Ahmed Ashraf (jury chairperson)music and culture journalist
 Jonas BrennaHead of publishing
 Jan Holmlundentertainment journalist
 Rannveig Sundelinvocalist
 Monica Johansenartist, songwriter, DJ

References

External links
Full national final on nrk.no

2014
Countries in the Eurovision Song Contest 2014
2014
Eurovision
Eurovision
Articles containing video clips